The Dumbrăvița is a left tributary of the Ilișua in Romania. It flows into the Ilișua near Căianu Mic.

References

Rivers of Romania
Rivers of Bistrița-Năsăud County